Gibberula thetisae is a species of sea snail, a marine gastropod mollusk, in the family Cystiscidae.

References

thetisae
Gastropods described in 2011